County Route 111 (CR 111) is a north–south county route in Suffolk County, New York, in the United States. It runs northwest and southeast from New York State Route 27 (NY 27) at exit 62 near Eastport to Interstate 495 (I-495) at exit 70 in Manorville. It serves as a connecting route between central Long Island and the Hamptons.  The road is known as Captain Daniel Roe Highway, for Captain Daniel Roe (1740–1820) of Selden, who served in the French and Indian War and was a captain in the Revolutionary War. Within Manorville, the road is also known as Eastport Manor Road. It also appears on maps as Port Jefferson-Westhampton Road, for the communities in which the route was originally intended to have its north and south endpoints in.

Route description
CR 111 begins at an incomplete interchange with NY 27. Currently a diamond interchange with collector/distributor roads, the intersection was originally planned as a cloverleaf with the service roads. It connects to CR 51 (East Moriches–Riverhead Road) by way of a half-diamond interchange, with an exit ramp from CR 111 south an entrance ramp to CR 111 north. Just past the junction, it crosses over a long dirt road named Toppings Path.

Northwest of Toppings Path, the highway approaches a slightly more residential area of Manorville to the west and Manorville Hills County Park to the east. The southbound lanes have a right-in/right-out interchange with Gordon Street, leading to Eastport–Manor Road (formerly CR 55). Soon after, CR 111 meets the northern end of Eastport–Manor Road at a signalized intersection with the southbound lanes.

Following a pair of traffic signals with Halsey Manor Road and Chapman Boulevard, the road enters a more commercial area with two main shopping centers anchored by a King Kullen supermarket and CVS Pharmacy. Northwest of here, CR 111 meets exit 70 of Interstate 495 (Long Island Expressway), a diamond interchange with traffic signals. CR 111 ends at the northern signal with I-495 west, but Eastport–Manor Road continues for a short distance as a two-lane,  street.

History
The route was first planned by Suffolk County in the 1960s to serve as a link between major locations on the northern and southern shores. However, the only part of this route to ever be constructed is a small section between Eastport and Manorville. The initial plans were cancelled due to county budget cuts and environmental opposition to constructing a highway through the Pine Barrens region.

Completed segment 
The current CR 111 opened to traffic in early 1975. It runs from the Long Island Expressway (I-495) in Manorville to Sunrise Highway (NY-27) in Eastport. It is a major link in the road network on Long Island. This is due to how it connects NY-27 to I-495, given the fact that it provides motorists with a link between the Hamptons and New York City, in addition to its suburbs in Nassau County and western Suffolk.

Unbuilt segments 

As suggested by its name, Port Jefferson–Westhampton Beach Road (CR 111) was intended to travel between Port Jefferson and Westhampton Beach, and connect to several highways via interchanges: the east end of CR 90, the west end of the cancelled extension of CR 105, and a cancelled northern extension of CR 55 (Eastport–Manor Road). As originally planned, CR 111 would have been a  highway extending from NY 25A and NY 347 in Port Jefferson Station to Montauk Highway in Westhampton Beach. In addition to being a convenient travel route, the routing would have been strategic, as well, as it was intentionally planned as a link between the deep-water port of Port Jefferson Harbor and the Calverton Naval Weapons Reserve Plant in Calverton to the former Suffolk County AFB in Westhampton Beach. 

As per the 1970 Nassau-Suffolk Regional Planning Board recommendation, CR 111 would be transferred to the New York State Department of Transportation (NYSDOT). This would have resulted in CR 111 being renamed as New York State Route 113.

Proposed routing
Heading southeast from NY 25A and NY 347, CR 111 was to replace Canal Road. It would then have interchanges with CR 83 (Patchogue–Mount Sinai Road) and Coram–Mount Sinai Road, where it would have broken away from Canal Road and run along its south side. CR 111 would then replace Whiskey Road west of its intersection with Miller Place–Middle Island Road and Coram–Sweezeytown Road. It would break away from Whiskey Road east of Middle Island Boulevard, cross over Miller Place–Yaphank Road, and reunite with Whiskey Road again until the proposed interchange with CR 21 (Rocky Point–Yaphank Road). CR 111 would then shift to the northeast corner of CR 21 and Whiskey Road, running parallel with Whiskey Road until north of the intersection with Currans Road, where it would cross over Whiskey Road and remain along its south side until its terminus at CR 46 (William Floyd Parkway) in Ridge.

East of William Floyd Parkway, CR 111 was intended to have an interchange and then curve south through Brookhaven State Park on land once formerly owned by the Brookhaven National Laboratory. After the interchange with NY 25, it would shift eastward along the northern border of Brookhaven Lab, crossing the Robert Cushman Murphy County Park twice. In between this Suffolk County Preserve area, it would run through the grounds of the Grumman Calverton Naval Weapons Industrial Reserve Plant.  It was to then follow along Wading River–Center Moriches Road (former CR 25) before heading south again toward the Peconic River. The road would join its existing section on the northeast corner of the westbound service road on the Long Island Expressway (I-495) at exit 70.

Continuing southeast from the existing highway's southeastern end at the interchange with NY 27, CR 111 was to run southeast across the Pine Barrens. It would run roughly parallel to CR 71 (Old Country Road) before intersecting with it at the Montauk Branch of the Long Island Rail Road. It was then intended to replace CR 71 as it crossed Montauk Highway and headed through the village of Westhampton Beach towards the Atlantic Ocean coastline.

Safety improvements

In the past few years, there have been renewed efforts by local residents and political leaders to reduce the high speed, unsafe conditions, and traffic that plagues CR 111, particularly during peak travel times in the summer season.  Notably, as the "Gateway to the Hamptons", CR 111 carries the majority of travelers who are making their way from the Long Island Expressway (I-495) to NY 27, and vice versa.  This causes perennial backups and frustrations on Friday and Sunday afternoons.

Local residents have been complaining for many years about the problem of the highway, particularly in Manorville, where CR 111 forms the backbone of the tiny hamlet and connects all of its services and stores.  These complaints have crescendoed in recent years as the accident rate on the road has risen alarmingly; the latter has finally prompted attention from Suffolk County.

Major intersections

References

External links

Photographs, December 28, 2003 (The Expressway Site)
Suffolk CR 111 (East Coast Roads)

Limited-access roads in New York (state)
111
Unfinished buildings and structures in the United States